Georg Pfeiffer (5 May 1890 – 28 June 1944) was a general in the Wehrmacht of Nazi Germany who commanded the VI Army Corps.  He was a recipient of the Knight's Cross of the Iron Cross. Pfeiffer was killed in an air attack on 28 June 1944 at Mogilev during Operation Bagration, the Soviet 1944 summer offensive.

Awards and decorations

 Knight's Cross of the Iron Cross on 15 January 1943 as Generalleutnant and commander of 94. Infanterie-Division

References

Citations

Bibliography

1890 births
1944 deaths
German Army generals of World War II
Generals of Artillery (Wehrmacht)
German commanders at the Battle of Stalingrad
German Army personnel killed in World War II
German Army personnel of World War I
People from Wolfenbüttel (district)
Recipients of the Gold German Cross
Recipients of the Knight's Cross of the Iron Cross
Military personnel from Lower Saxony